Kampong Panchor Papan (Malay for Panchor Papan Village) is a village in Tutong District, Brunei, within the mukim of Pekan Tutong. The postcode for Kampong Panchor Papan is TA1941.

References 

Panchor Papan